Choa Saidan Shah Tehsil , is an administrative subdivision (tehsil) of Chakwal District in the Punjab province of Pakistan. The tehsil is subdivided into 8 Union Councils, one of which forms the capital Choa Saidanshah.

Union Councils
Union Councils in the tehsil include Ara, Basharat, Choa Saidan Shah, Dalwal, Dandot, Dulmial, Lehr Sultanpur and Saloi.

References

Tehsils of Punjab, Pakistan
Chakwal District